This article shows all participating team squads at the 2005 Women's European Volleyball Championship, held in Pula and Zagreb, Croatia from September 17 to September 22, 2005.

Pool A

Head coach: Faig Garayev

Head coach: Ivica Jelić

Head coach: Lee Hee-Wan

Head coach: Andrzej Niemczyk

Head coach: Florin Grapa

Head coach: Zoran Terzić

Pool B

Head coach: Miroslav Zhivkov

Head coach: Marco Bonitta

Head coach: Avital Selinger

Head coach: Giovanni Caprara

Head coach: Aurenlio Urena

Head coach: Resat Yaziciogullari

References
CEV
Official Site

E
Women's European Volleyball Championships
Volleyball competitions in Croatia
2005 in Croatian women's sport